Voice (stylized as VOICE) is the debut Japanese extended play and the fifth overall by South Korean singer Taeyeon. It was released digitally on May 13, 2019, by SM Entertainment Japan, and physically on June 5 by Universal Music Japan sublabel EMI Records.

Background and release 
On April 12, 2019, it was announced that Taeyeon would release her first Japanese EP in June. The album includes the title track "Voice" for a total of six tracks. It was released in three editions: First Limited Edition A (Live Edition/CD+DVD); First Limited Edition B (Visual Edition/CD+DVD/Photobook); and the Normal CD.

Voice was released digitally on May 13, 2019.

Commercial performance

Japan 
Voice debuted and peaked at number 6 on Oricon's Digital Albums Chart with 1,134 download albums sold. It also debuted number 30 on Billboard Japan's Hot Albums chart and peaked at number 6 in its second week. It also debuted and peaked at number 7 on Billboard Japan's Top Download Albums and at number 4 on Top Albums Sales with 19,330 estimated copies sold nationwide.

The EP debuted at number 2 on Oricon's Daily Albums Chart with 14,692 physical copies sold. The album debuted at number 6 on the Oricon Albums Chart with 17,174 physical copies sold in its first week.

Other territories 
The EP debuted at number 11 on Billboards World Albums chart for the week ending May 25, 2019.

Track listing 
Credits adapted from Naver

Charts

Release history

References 

2019 EPs
Taeyeon EPs
Japanese-language EPs
EMI Records EPs